Bogdan Vladimirovich Karyukin (born 20 August 1985) is a Russian football player. He plays for FC Dynamo Barnaul.

Club career
He made his debut in the Russian Premier League for FC Kuban Krasnodar on 14 March 2009 in a game against FC Rubin Kazan.

External links
 
  Profile on the FC Kuban Krasnodar site

References

1985 births
Sportspeople from Barnaul
Living people
Russian footballers
FC Kuban Krasnodar players
Russian Premier League players
Association football goalkeepers
FC Dynamo Barnaul players
FC Novokuznetsk players